Vyacheslav Kulebyakin (born 30 November 1950) is a Soviet hurdler. He competed in the men's 110 metres hurdles at the 1976 Summer Olympics.

References

1950 births
Living people
Athletes (track and field) at the 1976 Summer Olympics
Soviet male hurdlers
Olympic athletes of the Soviet Union
Place of birth missing (living people)
Universiade bronze medalists for the Soviet Union
Universiade medalists in athletics (track and field)
Medalists at the 1977 Summer Universiade